Gustav Heinemann Bridge (German: Gustav-Heinemann-Brücke) is a bridge connecting Berlin-Moabit and Tiergarten in Berlin, Germany.

External links
 

Heinemann
Gustav Heinemann